Moyshe Kulbak (1896  1937) was a Belarusian Jewish writer who wrote in Yiddish.

Biography
Born in Smarhon (present-day Belarus, then in the Russian Empire) to a Jewish family, Kulbak studied at the famous Volozhin Yeshiva.

During the World War I he lived in Kovno (today, Kaunas, Lithuania), where he began to write poetry in Hebrew, before switching to Yiddish. He made his publishing debut in Yiddish in 1916, with the poem "Shterndl" (Little star). In 1918 he moved to the city of Minsk; in 1919, after the Soviet Revolution, to Vilna (today Vilnius, Lithuania); and in 1920 to Berlin.

In 1923 he came back to Vilna, which after the war had become part of newly independent Poland, and was a center of Yiddish literary culture. In Vilna he taught modern Yiddish literature at the Real-Gymnasium (a Yiddish-speaking high school), as well as at the Yiddish teachers' seminary. By 1928 he became disappointed with the literary atmosphere in Poland, and decided to return to Minsk (capital of the Soviet Belarus), where much of his family lived, and where there was a lively Yiddish literary scene.

In Minsk, Kulbak worked for several media organizations and for the Jewish section of the Academy of Sciences of Belarus.

Kulbak wrote poems, fantastical or "mystical" novels, and, after moving to the Soviet Union, what are described by one source as "Soviet" satires. His novel The Zelmenyaners depicted with some realism the absurdities of Soviet life.

His mystical novella The Messiah of the House of Ephraim (1924) draws together many strands of Jewish folklore and apocalyptic belief, presenting them from a perspective that owes much to German expressionist cinema. It principally concerns the poor man Benye, who may or may not be a Messiah, and whose destiny is intertwined with the Lamed-Vavniks. (In Jewish mysticism, the Lamed-Vavniks are a group of 36 holy Jews on whose goodness the whole of humanity depends.) Benye, and the many other characters, undergo experiences the strangeness of which approaches incomprehensibility, to themselves as well as the reader. Legendary figures such as Lilith and Simkhe Plakhte are characters in the novel.

In September 1937, Moyshe Kulbak was arrested during a wave of Stalinist purges. He was accused of espionage and executed a month later together with several dozens of other Belarusian writers, intellectuals and administrators. In 1956, after the death of Joseph Stalin, he was officially rehabilitated by the Soviet authorities.

Bibliography
 Shirim (Poems), 1920.
 Die Shtot (The Village) (Romantic poem), 1920.
 Raysn ("Belarus") (Poems), 1922.
 Lider (Poems), 1922.
 Yankev Frank (Drama),1922.
 Meshiekh ben Efrayine (Novel), 1924.
 The Messiah of the House of Ephraim - English translation in Yenne Velt, ed. and trans. Joachim Neugroschel (1976; repr. New York: Wallaby, 1978).
 Vilné (Poem), 1926.
 Montag (Monday) (Novel), 1926.
 Lunes - Editado por el Círculo d´Escritores, 2014.
 Bunye un Bere afn shliakh (Novel), 1927.
 Zelminianer (Novela), 1931;
  (Russian edition translated by Rachel Boymvol), 1960
 The Zelmenyaners: a family saga (English translation, 2013)
 Зельманцы (Belarusian version), Minsk, 1960 (2nd edition - 2015);
Los Zelmenianos (Spanish version), Xordica editorial, Zaragoza, 2016.
 Disner Childe Harold (Child Harold from Disna) (Satiric poem), 1933.
 The Wind Who Lost His Temper,
 English translation in Yenne Velt.
 Boitre (Dramatic poem), 1936.
 Beniomine Maguidov (Play), 1937.

References

External links 
 Moyshe Kulbak books in the Yiddish Book Center digital library (in Yiddish)
Lectures on Moyshe Kulbak's works by Marc Caplan from Dartmouth College and University of Wroclaw

1896 births
1937 deaths
People from Smarhon’
People from Oshmyansky Uyezd
Jews from the Russian Empire
Belarusian Jews
Yiddish-language poets
Jewish poets
Soviet poets
Belarusian male poets
Soviet male writers
20th-century male writers
Yiddish-language playwrights
20th-century dramatists and playwrights
Polish emigrants to the Soviet Union
Jews executed by the Soviet Union
Great Purge victims from Belarus